The Peter principle is a concept in management theory that people in a hierarchy rise to their level of incompetence.

Peter principle or The Peter Principle may also refer to:

The Peter Principle (TV series), a British television series
Software Peter principle, a concept in software engineering in which a project becomes too complex to be understood even by its creators
Peter Principle (1954–2017), American bass player for Tuxedomoon

See also
 "With great power comes great responsibility", also known as the Peter Parker principle